Kelvin House may refer to:

United Kingdom
Kelvin House, Bradford, West Yorkshire, England, part of Holme Wood housing estate
 Kelvin House, Carshalton, England, headquarters of the Institute of Refrigeration
 Kelvin House, Derby, England, part of Railway Technical Centre, former technical headquarters of the British Railways Board 
Kelvin House, Old Luce, a listed building in Old Luce, Dumfries and Galloway, Scotland
Kelvin House, Paisley, a listed building in Paisley, Renfrewshire, Scotland
Kelvin House, Ruislip, London, England, a former preparatory school founded by James Cameron Todd, named after Lord Kelvin

Other places
Kelvin House, Adelaide, a heritage-listed building in Adelaide, Australia, now known as Security House
Kelvin House, St John's, a Second Empire style house in Rennie's Mill Road, St John's, Newfoundland and Labrador, Canada